Park Hotel Group manages, owns and develops hotels in the Asia-Pacific region.

Park Hotel Group was founded in 1961 and is based in Singapore.

The chairman is the Hong Kong billionaire Law Kar Po, and the chief executive officer (CEO) is his son Allen Law.

Park Hotel Group manages 16 hotels in eleven cities and eight countries in the Asia-Pacific region with a total room count of 4,500. It operates hotels in Singapore; Bali, Indonesia; Kunming, Wuxi, and Xian in China; Hong Kong; Kodhipparu, Maldives and Otaru, Japan with upcoming properties in Malacca, Malaysia; Seoul, South Korea and Adelaide, Australia.

External links
 Official website

References

Hospitality companies established in 1961
Companies of Singapore
Singaporean brands
Singaporean companies established in 1961